Yara is a given name developed independently in the Arabic and Tupi languages, and also the anglicized spelling of a number of unrelated given names.
 Arabic Yara (يارا) meaning small butterfly
 Brazilian Portuguese Iara, a river spirit in  Tupi and Guarani mythology
 Persian - Yārā  يارا  (يارا) meaning "strength" or "courage". 
 Biblical Yaʿrah  (יַעֲרָה)  in the Masoretic text of  1 Chronicles 9:42 is a variant of יַעֲרָה yaʿărâh "forested",  used as a masculine given name of  a descendant of Saul (son of Micah, great-grandson of Mephibosheth).

In the 1990s, Yara (without identifiable etymology or ethnic connection) began to become popular as a girl's name in Western countries.

Notable people with the name include:

 Yara (singer) (born 1983), Lebanese singer
 Yara Amaral (1936–1988), Brazilian actress
 Yara Bernette (1920–2002), Brazilian classical pianist
 Yara Cortes (1921–2002), Brazilian actress
 Yara Dufren, real life contestant on 90 Day Fiancé in Season 6 (2020–21), husband of Jovi Dufren (m.2020)
 Yara Gambirasio (1997–2010), Italian murder victim
 Yara Goubran (born 1982), Egyptian actress 
 Yara Greyjoy, character in the ''Game of Thrones" HBO series, based on the "A Song of Ice and Fire" books by George R.R. Martin
 Yara Kastelijn (born 1997), Dutch racing cyclist
 Yara van Kerkhof (born 1990), Dutch skater
 Yara Lasanta (born 1986), Puerto Rican model
 Yara Martinez (born 1979), American actress
 Yara Bou Rada (born 2000), Lebanese footballer
 Yara Sallam (born 1985), Egyptian human-rights activist
 Yara dos Santos (born 1979), Cape Verdean writer
 Yara Shahidi (born 2000), American actress
 Yara Silva (born 1964), Brazilian footballer
 Yara Sofia (born 1984), Puerto Rican entertainer
 Yara Tupinambá (born 1932), Brazilian artist
 Yara Yavelberg (1943–1971), Brazilian psychologist
 Yara Amer (born 1996), Egyptian pharmacist.

See also
 Yusaku Yara (born 1948), Japanese actor
 Yara (disambiguation)

Notes

Arabic feminine given names
Brazilian given names